Breaking and Entering is a 2006 romantic crime drama film written and directed by Anthony Minghella and starring Jude Law, Juliette Binoche, and Robin Wright. It was his first original screenplay since his 1990 feature debut Truly, Madly, Deeply and his final feature film before his death in 2008. Set in a blighted, inner-city neighbourhood of London, the film is about a successful landscape architect whose dealings with a young thief and his mother cause him to re-evaluate his life.

Minghella previously directed the film's stars – Jude Law in Cold Mountain and The Talented Mr. Ripley, and Juliette Binoche in The English Patient. In his first major film role, Rafi Gavron portrays Miro, the young traceur burglar, a role requiring several difficult physical feats. The film is a presentation of Miramax Films and The Weinstein Company (TWC) and was distributed in the United States by Metro-Goldwyn-Mayer (MGM). Breaking and Entering premiered on 13 September 2006 at the Toronto International Film Festival.

Plot
Will Francis, a young Englishman, is a landscape architect living a detached, routine-based life in London with his Swedish-American girlfriend Liv and her autistic daughter Bea. The 13-year-old girl's irregular sleeping and eating habits as well as her unsocial behaviour (she has trouble relating to people and seems only interested in doing somersaults and gymnastics) reach worrying proportions and start to put a lot of strain on Will and Liv's relationship. Complicating the situation further is his feeling of being shut out of their inner circle since Bea is not his biological daughter. He and Liv start relationship counselling, but their drifting apart continues.

Simultaneously on the business front, Will's and his partner Sandy's state-of-the-art offices in the Kings Cross area are repeatedly burgled by a group of Slavic-language-speaking thieves. The thieves employ a 15-year-old traceur named Mirsad "Miro" whose acrobatic skills allow them to enter the building. Miro is actually a refugee from Bosnia and Herzegovina living with his Bosnian Muslim mother Amira (Juliette Binoche) who works as a seamstress, while his Serbian father got murdered during the war.

Though they're puzzled about the burglars' ability to disable the alarm, the two architects are not particularly worried after the first break-in, mostly writing it off to the neighbourhood's dodgy reputation. However, after the second break-in, they decide to stake out the building after hours hoping to find the culprit and alert the police. Being out of the house on nightly stakeouts actually suits Will just fine, allowing him to get away from the cold atmosphere of his household. 

Will strikes up a strange acquaintance with an Eastern European prostitute named Oana (Vera Farmiga) who hangs around the area every night. Spotting Miro attempting to break in one night, Will attempts to follow him. This pursuit leads Will to the flat where Miro lives with his mother Amira. Realizing their modest living means, he decides not to report his findings to the police, but goes back to Amira's apartment under the guise of having a suit that needs mending.

He soon becomes emotionally entangled with her, causing him to re-evaluate his life. Conflict arises when the police close in on the burglars, and Will must make a crucial choice which will affect the lives of everyone around him.

Cast

Production

Filming locations
The film centres on the area of King's Cross, London. The filming location for Amira's flat is Rowley Way, South Hampstead, London. Since a suitable location near Kings Cross couldn't be found, Will's office was recreated in an old foundry located in Dace Road, by the Old Ford Lock, in the London Borough of Tower Hamlets. Other locations include:
 Alexandra Palace, Haringey, London, England, UK (Miro and the cop)
 Camden Market, London, England, UK
 Hackney Wick, London, England, UK
 Hungerford Bridge, London, England, UK (sunset)
 King's Cross Station, King's Cross, London, England, UK
 Muswell Hill, Haringey, London, England, UK
 Primrose Hill, London, England, UK (sunset)
 Rowley Way, South Hampstead, London, England, UK (Amira's flat)
 St. Pancras Station, St. Pancras, London, England, UK

Soundtrack

Gabriel Yared and Underworld collaborated on the film's original music score.

Reception
Breaking and Entering received largely negative reviews from film critics, with review aggregator website Rotten Tomatoes giving the film a 34% rating based on 130 film critic reviews. The site's consensus reads: "This class warfare drama feels contrived and superficial: characters don't act logically as the movie manipulates them towards deconstructing various social issues." On Metacritic, the film holds a 56 out of 100 rating, based on 27 reviews.

References

External links
 
 
 

2006 films
2006 crime drama films
2006 romantic drama films
American crime drama films
American romantic drama films
British crime drama films
Films shot at Elstree Film Studios
Films about autism
Films about architecture
Films directed by Anthony Minghella
Films scored by Gabriel Yared
Films set in London
Films produced by Sydney Pollack
Films about the Serbian Mafia
Metro-Goldwyn-Mayer films
Miramax films
The Weinstein Company films
Romantic crime films
2000s English-language films
2000s American films
2000s British films
Films scored by Underworld (band)